Ål is a municipality in the traditional and electoral district Buskerud in Viken county, Norway. It is part of the traditional region of Hallingdal.  The administrative centre of the municipality is the village of Ål.
The parish of Aal was established as a municipality on 1 January 1838 (see formannskapsdistrikt). The area of Hol was separated from the municipality of Aal in 1877 to become a separate municipality.

Geography 

Ål borders the municipalities of Ål  Hol, Gol, Hemsedal, Nes, Nore og Uvdal, and Lærdal.

Hallingdalselva runs in the bottom of the main valley, forming Strandafjorden, a long, narrow lake for several kilometers. Ål has several hydroelectric dams.  Hallingdalselva runs partly in a tunnel from here to Nes municipality, where it drives a large turbine power plant.

Mountains 
Djupeskardnosi
Fossebreen
Haldalshøgdi
Langebottfjellet
Lysebottnuten
Mellomnuten

General information 
Approximately 5,000 inhabitants spread over several smaller villages including Ål, Torpo, Leveld, Vats, Trillhus, Granhagen, Breie and Strand. There is a strong cultural tradition, with folk music being a big part of people's identity. Folkemusikkveka is held every May for a week.

The traditional industry of Ål is mostly small-farming. Many livestock farms are still in operation with small herds of sheep, dairy cattle, and goats. Crop growing is difficult because of the steep valley walls, but wheat, barley, rye, and potatoes have all been grown in the past.

The award-winning local paper Hallingdølen has offices in the village of Ål. It comes on Tuesdays, Thursdays, and Saturdays. Ål has a Videregående school and a Folkehøyskole for deaf students.

Name 
The Old Norse form of the name was Áll. The name is identical with the word áll which means "ditch" or "gully".  In 1921, the spelling of the name was changed from "Aal" to "Ål".

Coat-of-arms 
The coat-of-arms is from modern times.  The arms were granted on 30 November 1984 and show three silver diamond shapes in a vertical line on a red background.  The designs are taken from an old and common pattern used in hand-woven tapestries in the area.  They also symbolize the three churches in the municipality: Ål, Torpo, and Leveld.

Attractions 

 Torpo Stave Church (built around 1190–1200) is located in Torpo
 Ål Bygdamuseum is built around the old Leksvol farm, and is typical of the area. The buildings go back to the 17th century. In later years the museum gained additional buildings, Øvre tunet, Stølen, and Husmannsplassen, where a stone cottage has been reconstructed, similar to those used in the mountain sæter.
 Hallingdal feriepark, camping with high ropes course and activities
 Ål Skisenter, downhill skiing facility

Notable people from Ål 

 Hallgrim Berg (born 1945), folk musician and politician
 Lars T. Bjella (1922–2013), politician, active in Ål local politics for 25 years
 Stein Torleif Bjella (born 1968), songwriter, singer, and guitarist
 Nils Terje Dalseide (1952–2018), judge and civil servant
 Kristian Hefte (1905–1977), actor
 Trond Helleland (born 1962), politician
 Odd Hoftun (born 1927), engineer and missionary to Nepal
 Eldbjørg Løwer (born 1943), politician
 Mikkel Ødelien (1893–1984), scientist, educator and soil researcher
 Einfrid Perstølen (1917–2017), psychiatrist and Nynorsk language proponent
 Ambjørg Sælthun (1922–2012), farmer and politician
 Ole Larsen Skattebøl (1844–1929), judge and politician
 Embrik Strand (1876–1947), entomologist and arachnologist
 Olav Thon (born 1923), real estate developer and billionaire

Sister cities 
The following cities are twinned with Ål:
  - Sololá, Sololá Department, Guatemala

See also 
Gråhyrnerene

References

External links 

 Municipal fact sheet from Statistics Norway
 Official Tourist Website
 Folkemusikkveka
 

 
Hallingdal
Municipalities of Buskerud
Municipalities of Viken (county)
Villages in Buskerud